The Pavilhão da Luz Nº 2 is the second arena of Portuguese multi-sport club S.L. Benfica. It has a full capacity of 1,800 seats and is mainly used by the handball and volleyball departments of the club.

Its construction ran at the same time as the adjacent arena, Pavilhão Fidelidade, but it was finished just a couple weeks later. Because the old Pavilhão da Luz was at full capacity with five sports, Benfica planned the new Estádio da Luz with two indoor arenas; the smaller one only hosting two departments. Its differences from the main arena are its roof and its two side stands, who sit fewer people.

References

External links
  

S.L. Benfica
Indoor arenas in Portugal
Sports venues in Lisbon
Sports venues completed in 2004
Handball venues in Portugal
Volleyball venues in Portugal